Abbeywood is a rural locality in the South Burnett Region, Queensland, Australia.

History 
Abbeywood Provisional School operated between August 1912 and July 1913 as a half-time school with Speedwell Provisional School (meaning they shared a single teacher between them). In November 1914,  Abbeywood State School was established, closing on 31 December 1969. It was at 402 Cridlands Road.

The name of the district was selected by schools' inspector Clement Lynam Fox when he approved the establishment of Abbeywood State School, choosing the name of his home town in England.  Prior to this the area was known interchangeably as the 'Overseas Settlement' or the 'Oswestry Grange Settlement', these names arising from the fact that a number of the newly surveyed blocks for selection were reserved for new immigrants and many of these had arrived on the ship Oswestry Grange.   These early settlers formed a progress association which agitated government authorities for improvements such as roads, schools at both Abbeywood and nearby Speedwell and a branch railway line which was later opened in 1923 to a new terminus at Proston, including a station at Hivesville.  The nearby village of Hivesville was for many years the main town of business for these early farmers.  These first settlers, took up uncleared selections of virgin bush, with most between 300 and 350 acres in size.  The price was seventeen shillings and sixpence an acre, payable to the Queensland Lands Department over thirty-three years in annual installments, at an interest rate of three percent.  Initially the bush and scrub was cleared and then corn and Rhodes grass planted.  Income was generated through dairying, with the cream being sent by rail to Maryborough in the earliest years and later to Murgon.  Excess milk was fed to pigs which generated further income and calves from the cows were also sold.  Corn was the most regular crop.  The system was viable, but only just, and there were many hard years.  Throughout the area, sub-district locality place names were gradually adopted, usually when a school, hall, rail siding or other building was initiated - such as Speedwell and Stalworth or Kinleymore.

One of the first selectors to take up a bush block for development into a farm was John (Reuben) Bull with his wife Louisa and six children in 1910.  Others which followed closely were Leonard Hatchett, Sydney Shaw, John Slinger, George Perkins, A. Chesterton, Martin Comerford, Martin McGovern, E.J.Cridland, William Waters, Wildfred Welch, Ezekial York, Henry Holdsworth and Harry Olsen.   Sydney Shaw became the first teacher at Abbeywood State School.

The earliest settlers joined with those at nearby Speedwell to form a progress association and collectively agitated government for improvements such as the railway line to Proston, better constructed roads and schools.  Funds were raised locally to build a hall at nearby Stalworth which became a popular venue for dances and social events.

Education 
There are no schools in Abbeywood. The nearest primary school is Proston State School in Proston to the south-west. The nearest secondary schools are the Proston State School (to Year 10) in Proston and Murgon State High School in Murgon to the south-east.

Facilities 
Despite the name, Abbeywood Rural Fire Station is at 6461 Gayndah Hivesville Road in neighbouring Stonelands; the Gayndah Hivesville Road is the border between the localities of Stonelands and Abbeywood.

References

Further reading 

 —includes the schools at Abbeywood, Brigooda, Hivesville, Kinleymore, Speedwell.

South Burnett Region
Localities in Queensland